This is a list of protests in the United States.

Presidents 
 Protests against George W. Bush
 Protests against Barack Obama
 Protests against Donald Trump

Party conventions 
 1968 Democratic National Convention protest activity
 2000 Democratic National Convention protest activity
 2004 Republican National Convention protest activity

Issues

Abortion 
 March for Life (Washington, D.C.)
 March for Women's Lives

Environment 

 Bayou Bridge Pipeline protests
Earth Day 1970, et al.
 Dakota Access Pipeline protests
 Forward on Climate
 March Against Monsanto
 March for Science Portland
 People's Climate March (2014)
 People's Climate March (2017)
 Seattle Arctic drilling protests
 School strike for climate
Stop Line 3
Thacker Pass lithium mine protests

Globalization 
 1999 Seattle WTO protests
 October Rebellion
 Washington A16, 2000

Guns 

 2018 United States gun violence protests
 2016 United States House of Representatives sit-in
 March for Our Lives
 Million Mom March
 2020 VCDL Lobby Day

Immigration 

 2006 United States immigration reform protests
 2007 MacArthur Park rallies
 2017 May Day protests
 Day Without Immigrants 2017
 Great American Boycott
 March 2006 LAUSD student walkouts
 March for America

Labor 
 Coxey's Army
 Fry's Army
 Minneapolis general strike of 1934
 San Francisco newspaper strike of 1994
 Solidarity Day march

LGBTQ+ rights 

 Hamilton Square Baptist Church protests
 National March on Washington for Lesbian and Gay Rights
 March on Washington for Lesbian, Gay and Bi Equal Rights and Liberation
 Millennium March on Washington
 National Equality March
 National Pride March
 Second National March on Washington for Lesbian and Gay Rights

Race 

 1987 Forsyth County protests
 2015 Baltimore protests
 Biloxi wade-ins
 Ferguson unrest
 Greensboro sit-ins
 Kenosha protests
 March Against Fear
 March on Washington for Jobs and Freedom
 Memphis sanitation strike
 Million Man March
 20th Anniversary of the Million Man March: Justice or Else
 Million Woman March
 Nashville sit-ins
 Prayer Pilgrimage for Freedom
 Royal Ice Cream sit-in
 Selma to Montgomery marches
 Silent Parade
 Trail of Broken Treaties
 George Floyd protests

Religion 
 Godless Americans March on Washington
 Washington for Jesus

Response to Coronavirus
 Protests in the United States over responses to the 2020 coronavirus pandemic

Taxes 

 Tax March
 Taxpayer March on Washington
 Tea Party protests
 Tax resistance in the United States

War 

 1971 May Day protests
 2003 Port of Oakland dock protest
 15 February 2003 anti-war protests
 20 March 2003 anti-war protest
 January 20, 2005 counter-inaugural protest
 September 24, 2005 anti-war protest
 2007 Port of Tacoma protests
 January 27, 2007 anti-war protest
 March 17, 2007 anti-war protest
 September 15, 2007 anti-war protest
 March 19, 2008 anti-war protest
 Columbia University protests of 1968
 Halloween 2002 anti-war protest
 March Against the Vietnam War
 Moratorium to End the War in Vietnam
 Protests against the war in Afghanistan (2001–2014)
 Rabbis' march (1943)
 Protests over the 2021 Israel–Palestine crisis

Women's rights 

 Woman Suffrage Procession of 1913 in Washington, D.C., led by Alice Paul
 March for the Equal Rights Amendment

Other 

 Protests after the passage of the Alien and Sedition Acts
 2015 Armenian March for Justice
 Anti-nuclear protests in the United States
 Bonus Army
 Deaf President Now
 Freedom Sunday for Soviet Jews
 San Francisco tech bus protests
 Guantanamo Bay hunger strikes
 John Sinclair Freedom Rally
 March for Truth
 Million Muslim March
 Million Puppet March
 Miss America protest
 Occupy Wall Street
 One Nation Working Together rally
 Rally to Restore Sanity and/or Fear
 Restoring Honor rally
 Stop Watching Us
 Tractorcade
 U.S. national anthem protests
 Women's Marches
 2017 Women's March
 2018 Women's March
 2019 Women's March

See also 
 List of protests in the 21st century
 List of protests in the United States by size
 List of rallies and protest marches in Washington, D.C.